Album is the first studio album by Italian rapper Ghali, released on 26 May 2017 by Sto Records. The album is triple platinum in Italy, having sold more than 150,000 copies.

Tracks

Charts

Certifications

References

External links 
 
 
 

2017 debut albums
Italian hip hop